José Gregorio Vargas  (born January 23, 1982) is a Venezuelan professional basketball player. He is a shooting guard-small forward.

Professional career
Vargas has played in several Venezuelan and Mexican teams during his pro career. In 2001, he was selected as rookie of the year in the Venezuelan League. For the 2016–17 season, he signed with La Unión de Formosa, of the top-tier level Argentine League.

National team career
Vargas is a member of the senior men's Venezuelan national basketball team.  As a member of the team at the 2015 FIBA Americas Championship, he helped Venezuela to defeat Uruguay and Canada to win the gold medal. That was Venezuela's first FIBA Americas Championship, and allowed them to qualify for the 2016 Summer Olympics in Rio, where Vargas also played.

Personal
Vargas' younger brother, Gregory, is also a professional basketball player. The two brothers have played together on the senior men's Venezuelan national basketball team.

References

External links
FIBA Profile
Latinbasket.com Profile
“Grillito”: vida y pasión por el básquet 

1982 births
Living people
Algodoneros de la Comarca players
Basketball players at the 2016 Summer Olympics
Basketball players at the 2019 Pan American Games
La Unión basketball players
Fuerza Regia de Monterrey players
Guaros de Lara (basketball) players
Marinos B.B.C. players
Ola Verde de Poza Rica players
Olympic basketball players of Venezuela
Shooting guards
Small forwards
Soles de Mexicali players
Sportspeople from Caracas
Trotamundos B.B.C. players
Venezuelan men's basketball players
Venezuelan expatriate basketball people in Argentina
Venezuelan expatriate basketball people in Mexico
2019 FIBA Basketball World Cup players
Pan American Games competitors for Venezuela
Basketball players at the 2015 Pan American Games